Grrr... is the third full-length album by the indie rock group Bishop Allen. It was released on March 10, 2009. It is the follow-up to their 2007 album, The Broken String.

Track listing
"Dimmer" – 2:46
"The Lion & the Teacup" – 3:01
"South China Moon" – 3:03
"Dirt on Your New Shoes" – 2:43
"Oklahoma" – 3:06
"The Ancient Commonsense of Things" – 3:13
"True or False" – 2:39
"Rooftop Brawl" – 2:55
"Shanghaied" – 2:33
"Don't Hide Away" – 2:26
"Cue the Elephants" – 2:39
"The Magpie" – 1:46
"Tiger, Tiger" – 3:03

References

2009 albums
Bishop Allen albums
Dead Oceans albums